MacArthur or Macarthur may refer to:

Places
 Macarthur, Australian Capital Territory, a suburb of Canberra, Australia
 Macarthur, New South Wales, a region of Metropolitan Sydney, Australia
 Division of Macarthur
 Macarthur railway station
 Macarthur, Victoria, Australia
 MacArthur, Leyte, Philippines
 MacArthur, West Virginia, U.S.

Other uses
 MacArthur (surname)
 Douglas MacArthur, a U.S. General of the Army
 Clan Arthur (also known as Clan MacArthur), a Scottish clan
 MacArthur (1977 film), a movie biography of General of the Army Douglas MacArthur
MacArthur (1999 film), a two-part television documentary film about Douglas MacArthur
 INSS MacArthur, a fictional starship featured in the science fiction novel The Mote in God's Eye
 Fort MacArthur, a former military base in Los Angeles
 Long Island MacArthur Airport, Suffolk County, New York
 Macarthur (novel), a novel by Bob Ong
 MacArthur Center, shopping mall in Norfolk, Virginia
 MacArthur Fellows Program, fellowship/grant awarded by the MacArthur Foundation 
 MacArthur Foundation, private, independent grantmaking institution
 MacArthur Freeway, segment of Interstate 580
 MacArthur Park, western Los Angeles, California
 "MacArthur Park" (song), a song based on the Los Angeles park
 Macarthur Rams FC, an Australian semi-professional football club based in Campbelltown, New South Wales, Australia
 Macarthur FC, an Australian professional football club based in South Western Sydney, New South Wales.

See also
 General MacArthur, Eastern Samar, Philippines
 John D. MacArthur Beach State Park, West Palm Beach, Florida
 MacArthur Boulevard (disambiguation), multiple uses
 McArthur (disambiguation)